Patty Schnyder was the defending champion, but lost in semifinals to Katarina Srebotnik

Vera Zvonareva won the title, defeating Srebotnik 6–2, 6–4 in the final. It was the 2nd title of the year and the 5th on her career.

Seeds

Draw

Finals

Top half

Bottom half

External links
 Main and Qualifying draws

2006 WTA Tour